A Hovmöller diagram is a common way of plotting meteorological data to highlight the behavior of waves, particularly tropical waves.  The axes of Hovmöller diagrams depict changes over time of scalar quantities such as temperature, density, and other values of constituents in the atmosphere or ocean, such as depth, height, or pressure. Typically in that case, time is recorded along the abscissa, or x-axis, while 'vertical' values (of depth, height, pressure, etc.) are plotted along the ordinate, or y-axis.

The alternate orientation of axes may also be used, as a Hovmöller diagram may be plotted for longitude or latitude on the abscissa and for (advancing) time on the ordinate; then the contour values of a named physical field may be presented through color or shading.

The Hovmöller diagram was introduced by Ernest Aabo Hovmöller (1912-2008), a Danish meteorologist, in a paper published in 1949.

See also 
Tropical wave
Heat map

References

External links
 An example Hovmöller diagram showing rainfall

Meteorological diagrams